Mysore Vasudevacharya (28 May 1865 – 17 May 1961) was an Indian musician and composer of Carnatic music compositions who belonged to the direct line of Thyagaraja's disciples. Vasudevachar's compositions (numbering over 200) were mostly in Telugu and Sanskrit. Some of his most popular kritis include Broche varevaru ra in Khamas raga, Devadideva in Sunadavinodini, Mamavatu Sri Saraswati in Hindolam, Shankari Ninne in Pantuvarali, Bhajare Re Manasa in Abheri and Ra Ra Rajeevalochana Rama in Mohanam.
 He was a recipient of the civilian honour of the Padma Bhushan.

He is credited with two writings in Kannada, one of them an autobiography called Nenapugalu (memories) and Na Kanda Kalavidaru (the musicians I have met) in which he wrote the biographies of many well known musicians. Mysore Vasudevachar also taught in Rukmini Devi's Kalakshetra, (founded in 1936). He was already quite old by then, but thanks to Rukmini Devi he agreed to shift to Kalakshetra. He became the chief musician in Kalakshetra and helped in setting the Ramayana to music. He died in 1961 at the age of 96. He lived a simple and austere life devoted to the study of Sanskrit and music.

S. Rajaram, his grandson worked at Kalakshetra eventually taking charge of the institution at Rukmini Devi's request. Vasudevachar had composed the music for only the first four kandas and it was left to Rajaram to finish the work. An accomplished musician and Sanskrit scholar, he was amongst the few musicians, the sole repository of Vasudevacharya's compositions. S. Krishnamurthy (1922–2015), his other grandson worked at All India Radio and translated his Vasudevachar's memoirs into English. He has also published a memoir of his own.

Early life
Vasudevacharya was born in an orthodox Madhwa Brahmin family in Mysore and started learning music from Veena Padmanabhiah, the chief musician of the Mysore court. He also mastered Sanskrit and allied fields such as Kavya, Vyakarana, Nataka, Alankaram, Tarka, Itihasa, Purana having studied at the Maharaja Sanskrit college in Mysore while learning music privately.

He then went on to learn from the famous composer-musician Patnam Subramania Iyer supported by the Maharaja's generous stipend and imbibed the music of not only his Guru but also other great maestros of the Thanjavur-Cauvery delta. Vasudevachar eventually became the chief court musician (Asthana Vidwan) at the Mysore court. He was known for his madhyama-kala tanam singing which he learnt from his Guru. Patnam Subramania Iyer often requested his sishya "Vasu" to help him with the sahitya (lyric) aspects of his compositions. This aspect of his training undoubtedly helped Vasudevacharya as a composer. He was adept in all the aspects of Carnatic music especially Raga Alapana, Thanam, Pallavi, Niraval, and Kalpana swaram.

Career
He published a large number of his compositions in the book Vasudeva Kirtana Manjari. His compositions in Telugu have such sweetness and lilt, and beautifully blend with the tune of the raga as do the Sanskrit compositions, which are mellifluous. His songs reflect his mastery of Sanskrit and show his erudition and scholarship in Sanskrit literature. He considered his insight into Telugu as a gift from Thyagaraja (Thyagaraja's bhiksha). Unlike the Dasa kuta songs, his compositions don't have any Dvaita undertones but many have the words "Paramapurusha Vasudeva" or "Vasudeva" which means the supreme Vasudeva/Lord Vishnu which incidentally is also his mudra or signature.

True to his Vaishnava heritage and the Thyagaraja shishya parampara to which he belonged, most of his compositions are in praise of Lord Rama. In addition to Kritis and Keertanas, he also composed Varnams, Thillanas, Javalis and slokas. His admiration for the trinity of Carnatic music specially Thyagaraja resulted in Srimadadi Thyagaraja Guruvaram in Kalyani, Shri Ramachandra (a ragamalika) and two other ragamalikas in praise of Muthuswami Dikshitar and Shyama Sastri. Vasudevachar's compositions are thus like sugar candy which gives one instant pleasure and yet lingers on in the mind and heart long after.

Compositions

References

See also
List of Carnatic composers

Carnatic composers
1865 births
1961 deaths
Musicians from Mysore
20th-century Indian composers
Recipients of the Padma Bhushan in arts
19th-century Indian composers
Recipients of the Sangeet Natak Akademi Award